The United Nations Technology Bank for Least Developed Countries was established as a subsidiary organ of the UN General Assembly on 23 December 2016 by the United Nations resolution 71/251 to support Least Developed Countries (LDCs) to strengthen their science and technology and innovation (STI) capacities.

The Technology Bank currently serves 46 LDCs and former LDCs for up to five years after they graduate from the category.

Origin 
In the Istanbul Programme of Action (IPoA) for the Least Developed Countries (LDCs) for the Decade 2011–2020, adopted in 2011, the Least Developed Countries called for the establishment of a “Technology Bank and Science, Technology and Information supporting mechanism, dedicated to least developed countries which would help improve least developed countries’ scientific research and innovation base, promote networking among researchers and research institutions, help least developed countries access and utilize critical technologies, and draw together bilateral initiatives and support by multilateral institutions and the private sector, building on the existing international initiatives.”

On 23 December 2016, the UN General Assembly adopted resolution 71/251 to establish the Technology Bank for the Least Developed Countries. By that resolution, the Assembly established the Technology Bank as a subsidiary organ of the General Assembly and adopted its Charter (71/363).

In the same resolution, the Assembly invited the Member States and other stakeholders to provide voluntary funding to the trust fund for the operationalization of the Technology Bank. An agreement was signed on 22 September 2017 between the United Nations and Turkey on financial and in-kind support of the Technology Bank. The Turkish Government committed to provide the Bank with $2 million annually for five years.

On 4 June 2018, the premises of the Technology Bank in Gebze, outside of Istanbul, Turkey were formally inaugurated by the UN Deputy Secretary-General, Amina J. Mohammed, and the Bank's first managing director, Joshua Phoho Setipa, who was subsequently appointed in December 2018.

The creation of the Technology Bank was a long-standing priority of the LDCs, which was confirmed in the Addis Ababa Action Agenda of the 3rd International Conference on Financing for Development and the 2030 Agenda for Sustainable Development. The full operationalization of the Technology Bank for the LDCs was part of target 17.8 of the Sustainable Development Goals, the first-ever SDG goal to be reached.

Mandate 
The core mission of the Technology Bank is to support LDCs to strengthen their science, technology, and innovation (STI) capacities, including the capacity to identify, absorb, develop, integrate and scale up the deployment of technologies and innovations, including indigenous ones, as well as the capacity to address and manage intellectual property rights issues to enhance their STI capacity.

The UN Technology Bank provides LDCs with a voice to chart their development through (A/71/363):

 Supporting LDCs to assess and articulate their needs through country-led technology needs assessments
 Strengthening science, technology, and innovation capacity in LDCs to respond to challenges and opportunities towards achieving the SDGs
 Facilitating access to appropriate technologies through technology transfer and provide access to research and technical knowledge
 Strengthening partnerships and coordination of STI between LDCs and relevant STI stakeholders

List of Managing Directors 

 Joshua Phoho Setipa (2018–2022)
 Taffere Tesfachew (2022-present) - as an Acting Managing Director

Key Documents 

 GA Resolution Establishing the Bank (A/RES/71/251)
 Charter of the Technology Bank for the Least Developed Countries (A/71/363)
 Supporting the operationalization of the Technology Bank for the Least Developed Countries: 3-year Strategic Plan
 Programme of Action for the Least Developed Countries for the Decade 2011-2020
 Review of the First Three Years of the Technology Bank for the Least Developed Countries (A/76/272)

References 

Organizations_established_by_the_United_Nations
United_Nations_General_Assembly_subsidiary_organs